Citice is a municipality and village in Sokolov District in the Karlovy Vary Region of the Czech Republic. It has about 900 inhabitants.

Administrative parts
The village of Hlavno is an administrative part of Citice.

Notable people
Erich Kühnhackl (born 1950), German ice hockey player and coach

References

Villages in Sokolov District